Eudiagogini is a weevil tribe in the subfamily Entiminae.

Genera 
Aetherhinus – Aracanthus – Chileudius – Colecerus – Eucoleocerus – Eudiagogus – Eudius – Eudomus – Eurpsaces – Oligocryptus – Pororhynchus – Promecops

References 

 LeConte, J.L. 1874: The classification of the rhynchophorous Coleoptera. The American naturalist, 8(7): 385–396.

External links 

Entiminae
Beetle tribes